Elena Ivashchenko (Елена Шлейзе; 28 December 1984 – 15 June 2013) was a Russian judoka.

Biography
Ivashchenko was born in Omsk, Russia on 28 December 1984.

She won a silver medal (2008) and two bronze medals (2007, 2011) at the World Judo Championships (and World Open Judo Championships). She also had four gold medals (2007, 2009, 2011, 2012) and one bronze medal (2006) at the European Judo Championships. She competed at the 2012 Summer Olympics in the +78 kg event and lost in the repechage to Iryna Kindzerska.

She committed suicide in Tyumen, Russia, at the age of 28 on 15 June 2013.

References

External links
 
 

1984 births
2013 suicides
Sportspeople from Omsk
Russian female judoka
Olympic judoka of Russia
Judoka at the 2012 Summer Olympics
Suicides by jumping in Russia
Universiade bronze medalists for Russia
Universiade medalists in judo
2013 deaths
21st-century Russian women